Hobday Island is an island of the Canadian Arctic Archipelago, in the territory of Nunavut. It lies in the Franklin Strait, between Prince of Wales Island (to the north and west) and Dixon Island (to the south-east).

Uninhabited islands of Kitikmeot Region